Highway 167 is a highway in the Canadian province of Saskatchewan. It runs from the Manitoba border between Creighton and Flin Flon, where it takes over from Manitoba Highway 10, to the Amisk Lake Recreation Site near the Amisk Lake Provincial Ecological Reserve.

About two-thirds of Highway 167 lies on the east coast of Amisk Lake. The town of Denare Beach is also accessible from the highway.

Highway 167 was originally signed as part of Highway 35, but was renumbered to its present designation around 1967.

Major intersections 
From south to north. The entire route is in Northern Administration District.

References 

167